Utility cycling encompasses any cycling done simply as a means of transport rather than as a sport or leisure activity. It is the original and most common type of cycling in the world. Cycling mobility is one of the various types of private transport and a major part of individual mobility.

Overview 

Utility or "transportational" cycling generally involves traveling short and medium distances (several kilometres, not uncommonly 3–15 kilometres one way, or somewhat longer), often in an urban environment. It includes commuting (i.e. going to work, school or university), going shopping and running errands, as well as heading out to see friends and family or for other social activities.

It also includes economic activity such as the delivering of goods or services. In cities, the bicycle courier is often a familiar feature, and cargo bikes are capable of competing with trucks and vans particularly where many small deliveries are required, especially in congested areas. Velotaxis can also provide a public transport service like buses and taxicabs.

Utility cycling is known to have several social and economic benefits. Policies that encourage utility cycling have been proposed and implemented for reasons including: improved public health, individual health and employers' profits a reduction in traffic congestion and air pollution, improvements in road traffic safety, improved quality of life, improved mobility and social inclusiveness, and benefits to child development.

In the Chinese city of Beijing alone, there are an estimated four million bicycles in use (it has been estimated that in the early-1980s there were approximately 500 million cyclists in China). As of 2000, there were an estimated 80 million bicycles in Japan, accounting for 17% of commuter trips, and in the Netherlands, 27% of all trips are made by bicycle.

Cycling has been considered 

Cycling mobility can be contrasted with mass automobility for which it is an immediate competitor in cities and for shorter distances.

Cities are a hotbed for experimenting with new bicycle-based forms of mobility like bicycle sharing, electric bicycles and transport of bulky goods with cargo bikes. 
After decades of relative stagnation in bicycle development, new technologies and materials are tried to further improve upon the environmental footprint of the bicycle.  Even though it is recognized that cycling - the one foremost active mobility besides walking - is the most sustainable kind of mobility and means of transportation, in some countries, cycling is still the mode of transport for the poor; in  others, cycling is seen fit only for leisure purposes.
In a 2010 document requested by the European Parliament Committee on Transport and Tourism that mobility not only entails the ability to travel, but also encompasses, more importantly, the possibility for the traveller to decide when and where to travel. In terms of this flexibility and cost, bicycles rank among the top choices for shorter distances, up to several kilometers.

History 

The development of the safety bicycle was arguably the most important change in the history of the bicycle. It shifted their use and public perception from being a dangerous toy for sporting young men to being an everyday transport tool for men—and, crucially, women—of all ages.
By the start of the 20th century, cycling had become an important means of transportation, and in the United States an increasingly popular form of recreation. Bicycling clubs for men and women spread across the U.S. and across European countries.
Cycling steadily became more important in Europe over the first half of the twentieth century, but it dropped off dramatically in the United States between 1900 and 1910. Automobiles became the preferred means of transportation. Over the 1920s, bicycles gradually became considered children's toys, and by 1940 most bicycles in the United States were made for children.
For most of the twentieth century, the great majority of cycling in the UK took place on roads. Cycling is one of the modes of transport for student transport.

The bicycle and the cyclist's equipment 

Utility bicycles have many standard features to enhance their usefulness and comfort. Chain guards and mudguards, or fenders, protect clothes and moving parts from oil and spray. Skirt guards prevent long coats, skirts, and other trailing clothes and items catching in the wheel. Kickstands help with parking. Front-mounted wicker or steel baskets for carrying goods are often used. Rear luggage carriers can be used to carry items such as school satchels.

Panniers or special luggage carriers (including waterproof packing bags) enable the transport of goods and are used for shopping. Parents sometimes add rear-mounted child seats and/or an auxiliary saddle fitted to the crossbar to transport children. Trailers of various types and load capacities may be towed to greatly increase cargo capacity. In many jurisdictions bicycles must be fitted with a bell; reflectors; and, after dark, front and rear lights.

The use by cyclists of vests or armbands fluorescent in daylight or reflective at night can increase a cyclist's conspicuity, although these are not an alternative to a legally compliant lighting system. A report on the promotion of walking and cycling (Hydén, et al., 1999) discussed safety clothing and equipment and stated that "there is no doubt that both pedestrian reflectors and bicycle helmets are reducing the injury risk of their users quite considerably", although this assertion is not universally accepted.

Factors that influence levels of utility cycling 
Many different factors combine to influence levels of utility cycling. In developing economies, a large amount of utility cycling may be seen simply because the bicycle is the most affordable form of vehicular transport available to many people. In richer countries, where people can have the choice of a mixture of transport types, a complex interplay of other factors influences the level of bicycle use.

Factors affecting cycling levels may include: town planning (including quality of infrastructure: cyclist "friendly" vs. cyclist "hostile"), trip-end facilities (particularly secure parking), retail policy, marketing the public image of cycling, integration with other transport modes, cycle training, terrain (hilly vs. flat), distance to destinations, levels of motorized transport and climate as well as cost. In developed countries cycling has to compete with, and work with, alternative transport modes such as private cars, public transport and walking. Thus cycling levels are not influenced just by the attractiveness of cycling alone, but also by what makes the competing modes more or less attractive.

In developed countries with high utility cycling levels, utility cyclists tend to undertake relatively short journeys. According to Irish 1996 Census data, over 55% of cycling workers travelled 3 miles (4.8 km) or less, 27% 5 miles (8 km) or less and only 17% travelled more than 5 miles in their daily commute. It can be argued that factors that directly influence trip length or journey time are among the most important in making cycling a competitive transport mode. Car ownership rates can also be influential. In New York City, more than half of all households do not own a car (the figure is even higher in Manhattan, over 75%), and walk/bicycle modes of travel account for 21% of all modes for trips in the city.
E-bike use was shown to increase the distance cycled for commuting as well as the amount of physical activity among E-bike users in seven European cities.

Decisions taken by various levels of government, as well as local groups, residents' organizations and public- and private-sector employers, can all affect the so-called "modal choice" or "modal split" in daily transport. In some cases, various factors may be manipulated in a manner that deliberately seeks to encourage or discourage various transport modes, including cycling.

The League of American Bicyclists has designated a set of five criteria for evaluating the friendliness of a town or city to bicycles. These criteria are classified under the headings of: Engineering, Encouragement, Evaluation and Planning, Education, Enforcement.

Town planning 

Trip length and journey times are key factors affecting cycle use. Town planning may have a key effect in deciding whether key destinations, schools, shops, colleges, health clinics, public transport interchanges remain within a reasonable cycling distance of the areas where people live. The urban form can influence these issues, compact and circular settlement patterns tending to promote cycling. Alternatively, the low-density, non-circular (i.e., linear) settlement patterns characteristic of urban sprawl tends to discourage cycling. In 1990, the Dutch adopted the "ABC" guidelines, specifically limiting developments that are major attractants to locations that are readily accessible by non-car users.

Settlements that provide a dense road network consisting of interconnected streets will tend to be viable utility cycling environments. In contrast, other communities may use a cul-de-sac based, housing estate/housing subdivision model where minor roads are disconnected and only feed into a street hierarchy of progressively more "arterial" type roads. Such communities may discourage cycling by imposing unnecessary detours and forcing all cyclists onto arterial roads, which may be perceived as busy and dangerous, for all trips regardless of destination or purpose.

There is evidence that people who live in such estates are heavier than people who live in places where walking and cycling are more convenient. It is also reported that the extra motor-traffic such communities generate tends to increase overall per-capita traffic casualty rates. Designs that propose to resolve the contradiction between the cul-de-sac and the traditional interconnected network, such as the Fused Grid, have been proposed and built with varying levels of success. Particular issues have arisen with personal security and public order problems in some housing schemes using "back alley" or "back garden" type links. The UK Manual for Roads (2007) states: "The basic tenet is 'public fronts and private backs'. Ideally, and certainly, in terms of crime prevention, back gardens should adjoin other back gardens or a secure communal space. ... If streets are bounded by back-garden fences or hedges, security problems can increase, drivers may be encouraged to speed, land is inefficiently used, and there is a lack of a sense of place."

Cycling infrastructure 

Cycling is a common mode of transport in the Netherlands, with 36% of the people listing the bicycle as their most frequent mode of transport on a typical day as opposed to the car by 45% and public transport by 11%. Cycling has a modal share of 27% of all trips (urban and rural) nationwide.

This high modal share for bicycle travel is enabled by unusually flat topography, excellent cycling infrastructure such as cycle paths, cycle tracks, protected intersections, ample bicycle parking and by making cycling routes shorter, quicker and more direct than car routes.

In the countryside, a growing number of inter-city bicycle paths connect the Netherlands' villages, towns and cities: some of these paths are part of the Dutch National Cycle Network, a network of routes for bicycle tourism which reaches all corners of the nation.

In cities modal share for bicycles is even higher, such as Amsterdam which has 38%.

Marketing: the public image of cycling 
As with other activities, cycling can be promoted by marketing.  Promotors may include official agencies and authorities.

Positive marketing of cycling 
Two themes predominate in cycling promotion 1) the benefits for the cyclist and 2) the benefits for society and the environment that may occur if more people choose to cycle. The benefits for the cyclist tend to focus issues like reduced journey times in congested urban conditions and the health benefits which the cyclist obtains through regular exercise. Societal benefits focus on general environmental and public health issues. Promotional messages and tactics may include:
 financial savings on transportation
 keeping travel times predictable; in peak traffic, cycling can be the fastest way of moving around town
 ensuring best use of the space available (during trips and also while parked), therefore reducing congestion on the roads
 reminding people of the advantages in terms of health and of effectiveness of using the bicycle
 making maps of journeys that can be completed by bicycle
 reducing demand for oil-based fuels
 the safety in numbers effect if more people cycle
 reduced noise pollution in urban areas
 amusement
 cyclist health
 lowering the risk of cardiovascular disease (when practised for more than a quarter of an hour a day at a moderate pace) and therefore improvement of individual and public health
 using cycling to tackle the obesity crisis facing rich countries
 the financial savings for society if general health improves

Further following positive aspects are:
transport  efficiency - cycling  is  the  fastest  and  most  flexible mode for 'door to door' travel, like in bicycle commuting.
environmental benefits - most energy efficient means of transport, with the least pollution.
health and fitness issues - 4 hours of cycling per week or approximately 10 km of cycling per day, equivalent to the average cycle trip to and from work, is an adequate level of exercise.
economic and social impacts - cycling provides  transport to segments of the population who would not otherwise be able to travel independently for reasons of age (student transport), poverty, insufficient public transport infrastructure, etc.

Negative marketing of utility cycling 
Various interests may wish to portray a negative image of utility cycling on public roads for various reasons. Some governments, wishing to promote private car use, have organized and funded publicity designed to discourage road cycling. Official road safety organisations have been accused of distributing literature that emphasizes the danger of cycling on roads while failing to address attitudinal issues among the drivers of motor vehicles who are the main source of road danger. Some road safety authorities have been accused of having a deliberate policy of discouraging cycling as a means of reducing bicyclist casualty statistics. In 2003, Shanghai police officials released statements blaming cyclists as the cause of "gridlock" in the city and promoting plans to ban cyclists from the city streets. Starting in the 1970s, the authorities in the city of Jakarta declared "war" on the "becak" or Indonesian cycle rickshaw blaming them for traffic congestion among other things.

As with other sellers of consumer goods, the car industry's marketing efforts frequently try to associate the use of their product with a perception of increased social status. Observers in some car-focused cultures have noted a tendency to perceive or portray people who use bicycles as members of a social "out-group" with attributed negative connotations. In such cultures, such attitudes are displayed in attacks on cyclists in the media.  Common themes include blanket descriptions of cyclists as a group who do not pay taxes, who break the law and who have no, or reduced, "right" to use public roads.

Negative aspects are:
lack of or inadequacy of road and parking infrastructures - roads are built for cars and bicycle paths are often in worse condition than roads. Cycling infrastructure and bicycle-friendliness is generally neglected in favor of a car-centric infrastructure.
cyclists’  safety and security - the common space for cars and bicycles on the road is not complemented by the same rights and significantly higher risk of accidents for cyclists.
weather conditions - rain and snow impact the unsheltered cyclist more than car drivers.
poor intermodality - because of lack of transport facilities for the bicycles themselves (in trains, buses, etc.) for longer distances.

Retail policy 
If significant use of bicycles for shopping trips is to be achieved, sufficient retail services must be maintained within reasonable cycling distances of residential areas. In countries like Denmark, the Netherlands and Germany the high levels of utility cycling also includes shopping trips e.g. 9% of all shopping trips in Germany are by bicycle. It is arguable that this is related to policies that favour access to retail services by non-motorised modes. The Danish 1997 Planning Act requires that planning shall encourage a diverse mix of retail shops in small and medium-sized towns and in individual districts of large cities and ensure that retail trade uses will be placed in locations to which people have good access by walking, bicycling and public transport. From the mid-1970s the Netherlands has had policies in place to severely restrict the growth of large out-of-town retail developments. Germany has had federal planning regulations in place to restrict retail uses to designated areas since the 1960s. In addition, since the 1970s federal regulations have been in place specifying that developments above a certain size (1,200 m2) be assessed regarding potential adverse effects. These federal regulations are further strengthened by regionally adopted regulations. This includes regulations specifying that new retail centers be limited to selling products not readily provided by shops at inner city/town center locations. In Denmark, the Netherlands, and Germany, this approach not restricted to planning guidelines and is also supported by a ban on below-cost selling. This supports smaller shops by preventing large multiples from engaging in predatory pricing practices by aggressively discounting key goods to use as so-called loss leaders.

Alternative retail policies 
From the 1980s to mid-1990s the UK operated a system of laissez-faire with regard to retail policy. The "great car economy" philosophy of the Thatcher government directly favored the growth of out-of-town retail centers at the expense of established retail services in British towns and cities. The UK Town and Country Planning Association cites research by the New Economics Foundation that notes a continuing process of change in retail provision.
 General stores are closing at the rate of one per day.
 Between 1997 and 2002, specialized stores, including butchers, bakers, fishmongers, and newsagents, closed at the rate of 50 per week.
 Nearly 30,000 independent food, drink, and tobacco retailers, or over 40%, have been lost over the past decade.

It is arguable that in such a retail/planning policy environment use of bicycles ceases to be a viable option for many shoppers and access to a private motor-car or public transport becomes a necessary prerequisite for access to basic services.

Cycle training 
Cycle training is another measure that is advocated as a means of maintaining or increasing levels of cycle use. The training involves teaching existing or potential cyclists bike handling, various roadcraft or "cyclecraft" skills (vehicular cycling) and educating them on the safe, lawful use of the roads. Bicycle training schemes can be differentiated according to whether they are aimed at children or adults.

In the UK, the now superseded National Cycle Proficiency scheme was focused on primary schoolchildren aged 8 and above. In this, children would start by gaining an off-road certificate working up to their on-road certificate by the age of ten. Initial training and examination took place on simulated road layouts within school playgrounds. This approach has now been supplemented by the new National Standard for cycle training which is more focussed on practical on-road training. This is part of Cycling England's portfolio of practical assistance to local authorities and other bodies, aimed at achieving their aim of "More cycling, more safely, more often".

In the United States, the League of American Bicyclists Smart Cycling 101/201 courses, based on the Effective Cycling program, has modules aimed at all ages from children to adult beginners to more experienced adults. It is argued that such schemes do not just build confidence in the students but also make it more likely that parents will let their children cycle to school. Cycle training may also be offered in an attempt to overcome cultural unfamiliarity with cycling or perceived cultural obstacles to bicycle use. In the Netherlands, some cycle training courses are targeted at women from immigrant communities, as a means of overcoming such obstacles to cycling by women from developing countries.

User associations 
As with other walks of life, utility cyclists may form associations in order to promote and develop cycling as an everyday form of transport. The European Cyclists' Federation is the umbrella body for such groups in Europe. These associations may lobby various institutions to encourage political support or to oppose measures that they judge counter-productive, such as to oppose the introduction of compulsory bicycle helmet legislation.

Free bicycle/short term hire schemes 

Local bike-sharing schemes, a business which blossomed at the turn of the 21st century, are more oriented to utility cycling than other bike rentals.

Influence of technology 

Modern bicycle technology supports the shift towards utility cycling:
 easy-running thick tires or damped springs allow cycling over curbs
 dynamo, brakes, and gears improved and increased the riding safety, allowing usage also for elderly
 electric support was further developed in motorized bicycle or electric power-assist system and eases the take up for untrained

See also 

 Bicycle carrier
 Bicycle commuting
 Bicycle culture
 Bicycle-friendly
 Bicycle trailer
 Bicycle transportation planning and engineering
 Boda-boda
 Car dependency
 City bicycle
 Critical Mass
 Cyclability
 Cycling advocacy
 Fuel efficiency
 Human-powered transport
 Outline of cycling
 Police bicycle
 Quadracycle
 Cycling infrastructure
 Shared space
 Tricycle
 Tweed Run
 Urban vitality
 Vehicular cycling

 Xtracycle

References

Notes

Bibliography 

 Paul Niquette, A Certain Bicyclist: An Offbeat Guide to the Post-Petroleum Age – Editor: Seven Palms Press (1985) – 
 Robert Hurst, The Art of Urban Cycling: Lessons from the Street – Editor: Falcon; 1st edition (1 July 2004) – , .

 
Sustainable transport
Transportation planning